Million Air is a privately held aviation company that operates fixed-base operators (FBOs) in North America, the Caribbean, Latin America, Asia, . It is headquartered in the United States in Houston, Texas, and was founded in 1984.

History 

Million Air was founded in 1984  as a single-site FBO located in Dallas, Texas. Million Air's goal was to deliver a higher level of service through a luxury FBO to customers in Dallas, consistent to the corporate image within the confines of its corporate jet. In 1984 Million Air Dallas opened in Addison, Texas, as a full-service, first-class business executive lounge for arriving and departing aircraft which was unique at the time.

Operations

The Million Air system operates throughout the United States, Canada and Colombia. It has 1,200 employees and more than 1,050 aircraft within its leasehold. Million Air serves many aircraft on a daily basis throughout its network of FBOs.

Aviation services 
An FBO is a refueling facility for aircraft that also offers a variety of other aviation-related services. Million Air FBOs provide fueling services, aircraft charter, aircraft sales, aircraft management, and general aviation maintenance services.

In addition, Million Air has its very own Private Jet Lifestyle Television Network, operated at its corporate headquarters. The platform offers luxury advertisers a guaranteed reach into the ultra-affluent and corporate passengers' eyesight, with 4K SUHD screens and video walls in each of the Million Air private aviation terminals, showing high-quality content and advertising, purchased by luxury agencies around the globe.

External links

 http://www.millionair.com

Fixed-base operators
Charter airlines of the United States
Airlines based in Texas